Live: Legend I, D, Z Apocalypse is the first video album by Japanese heavy metal band Babymetal. The album contains live footage of three shows, entitled Legend "I", Legend "D", and Legend "Z", respectively
(spelling out the initials of "Ijime, Dame, Zettai"), performed in Tokyo from late 2012 to early 2013. The album was released for general sale in Blu-ray format on November 20, 2013.

Background 
On July 7, 2012, Babymetal announced the first of three shows to be performed on October 6, 2012 at the venue Shibuya O-East, the same location for the concert Legend Corset Festival to promote the single "Headbangeeeeerrrrr!!!!!". Tickets were made available for presale starting August 20, 2012, and sold out on September 8, 2012. After the end of each show, the band announced the next show set for December 20, 2012 at Akasaka Blitz and February 1, 2013 at Zepp Tokyo, respectively, with tickets immediately available for presale.

Live: Legend I, D, Z Apocalypse was first announced with a posted trailer on September 24, 2013. The initial release on October 19, 2013 consisted of a three-disc DVD box set limited to 1,500 copies, and exclusively sold via Tower Records and in the Tokyo (Shinjuku) Beams Japan store. The DVD release was promoted as part of "Tower Records Shinjuku 15th Anniversary Thanksgiving – Festival of 15", and was featured in the idol project "No Music, No Idol?".

The video was later released on Blu-ray version on November 20, 2013. The video contains all three concerts that the band gave in Tokyo as its first set of headlining shows (natively called "one-man live", a wasei-eigo term for an entire concert performed only by one artist): on October 6 at Shibuya O-East, on December 20, 2012 at Akasaka Blitz, and on February 1, 2013 at Zepp Tokyo.

The album has since been released in a vinyl format on August 25, 2021 to commemorate the band's tenth anniversary.

Content 
The band performed live at Shibuya O-East on October 6, 2012, beginning with the opening track "Babymetal Death". After performing more songs, Nakamoto leaves the stage while Mizuno and Kikuchi debut the song "Onedari Daisakusen", performing as Black Babymetal while wearing black hooded jackets and grasping a towel, shouting chants "Katte!" (Buy!) and "Chōdai!" (Please!). Next, Nakamoto performs the new song "Akatsuki", with the performance emphasizing vocal ability over melody. After the performance of "Doki Doki ☆ Morning", the three members leave the stage and apparently end the show shouting "See you!". However, the members eventually return to the stage via coffins, and, for the first time, perform the music with a live band in the encore. After "Ijime, Dame, Zettai" ends, the song is announced for a single release on January 9, 2013.

Next, the band performed at Akasaka Blitz on December 20, 2012, nearly coinciding with Nakamoto's fifteenth birthday. Three covers are performed, including a cover of the Speed song "White Love" performed solely by Nakamoto, the Karen Girl's song "Over The Future" (of which Nakamoto was a member), and the folk song "Tsubasa o Kudasai" in the encore. The band also performs a remix of their song "Headbangeeeeerrrrr!!!!!", which contains elements of dubstep. In the encore, a video interlude explains that Nakamoto must rescue Mizuno and Kikuchi, and the concert ends with her apparent crucifixion.

For the last of three concerts, Babymetal performed at Zepp Tokyo on February 1, 2013. In continuation of the events from the previous concert, Nakamoto begins on stage crucified, then performs "Ijime, Dame, Zettai" with Mizuno and Kikuchi. In the concert, the band performs the song "Catch Me If You Can" live for the first time, which appeared on the band's newly released single "Ijime, Dame, Zettai". In the encore, a clock counts down to 00:00:00, at which point Nakamoto whispers "We are…" with the audience shouting "Babymetal!"; this repeats with increasing volume until the band begins to perform "Babymetal Death" live. At this point, the three members of the band are draped in white stage costumes. At the end of the show, an announcement is made for another concert at NHK Hall on June 30, while the management reveals that Babymetal would remain active after Nakamoto leaves Sakura Gakuin.

Reception 
Live: Legend I, D, Z Apocalypse debuted on the Oricon weekly Blu-ray chart at number seven for the week of December 2, 2013, with first-week sales of 4,908 copies. The video also charted at number two for the music video sub-chart the same week.

Track listing

Personnel 
Credits adapted from Live: Legend I, D, Z Apocalypse booklet.
 Su-metal (Suzuka Nakamoto) – lead and background vocals, dance
 Yuimetal (Yui Mizuno) – lead and background vocals (credited as "scream"), dance
 Moametal (Moa Kikuchi) – lead and background vocals (credited as "scream"), dance
 Arai Hiroki – guitar
 Shiren – guitar
 Ryo – bass
 Shin – drums
 Takayoshi Ohmura – guitar
 Ikuo – bass
 Hideki Aoyama – drums
 Hidefumi Usami – arrangement

Charts

Release history

References

External links 
 Discography - Babymetal official website
 
 
 
 

Babymetal video albums
Albums recorded at Akasaka Blitz
Albums recorded at Zepp Tokyo
2013 video albums
2021 live albums
Live video albums